Life of the Virgin is a series of nineteen woodcuts plus a frontispiece, published in book form. It was begun by Albrecht Dürer just after 1500 and only completed 1510-1511. One of the best surviving sets is now in the Staatliche Graphische Sammlung München.

It was begun whilst he was still halfway through work on his Great Passion series. Only sixteen of the plates were complete by 1504, with final completion further delayed by the artist's second stay in Venice from 1504 to 1505.

Gallery

References

Prints by Albrecht Dürer
Prints including the Virgin Mary
1500s works
1510s works

Woodcuts
16th-century prints

Catholic engraving